Dorthea Lauren Allegra Lapkus (born September 6, 1985) is an American actress and comedian. Lapkus is known for portraying Susan Fischer in the Netflix comedy-drama series Orange Is the New Black (2013–2014, 2019) and Jess in the HBO comedy-drama series Crashing (2017–2019). She has also appeared in the television series Are You There, Chelsea? (2012), Hot in Cleveland (2012), Clipped (2015), The Big Bang Theory (2018–2019), and Good Girls (2020–2021) and in the films Jurassic World (2015), The Unicorn (2018), and The Wrong Missy (2020). She played the voice role of Lotta in the animated comedy series Harvey Girls Forever! (2018–2020).

Lapkus has appeared on various podcasts, including Comedy Bang! Bang!, improv4humans, and her own podcasts With Special Guest Lauren Lapkus, Laptime with Lauren Lapkus, Threedom, Raised by TV, and Newcomers.

Early life
Dorthea Lauren Allegra Lapkus was born on September 6, 1985 in Evanston, Illinois. At an early age she filmed sketches with her older brother and later at Evanston Township High School she participated in the annual student revue and variety show YAMO.

During her senior year of high school, she began taking improv classes at the iO Theater. She attended DePaul University graduating in 2008 with a degree in English, while she continued performing improv most nights. Lapkus credits watching many television sitcoms and Saturday Night Live while young for inspiring her to become a comedian.

Upon graduation, she moved to New York City where she became involved with Upright Citizens Brigade Theatre. After living in New York City for 15 months, she relocated to Los Angeles in 2010.

Career
After almost a year in Los Angeles, Lapkus began landing roles in a number of commercials, including Snickers and Jack in the Box as well as a sketch on Jimmy Kimmel Live! From these successes, she got herself representation and during pilot season landed a supporting role in the short-lived Are You There, Chelsea?.

After self-taping her audition, Lapkus was cast as security guard Susan Fischer on the first and second seasons of the Netflix series Orange is the New Black. In 2015, Lapkus and the cast won the Screen Actors Guild Award for Outstanding Performance by an Ensemble in a Comedy Series.

In 2014, Lapkus launched her own podcast on the Earwolf network, called With Special Guest Lauren Lapkus, in which each week her guest is the host of their own podcast, and she appears as a character on their show. Her guests have included Paul F. Tompkins, Betsy Sodaro, Andy Daly, Nick Kroll, and Scott Aukerman. She has said that she "never expected to get into podcasts at all" and to her it is funny she has one.

In mid-2014, Lapkus was cast in Jurassic World, which she filmed in both Hawaii and New Orleans. Many of her scenes with Jake Johnson were improvised. In 2015, she portrayed Joy the receptionist in TBS's Clipped. In 2016, Lapkus wrote and starred in her own 30-minute episode of the sketch show Netflix Presents: The Characters.

Between 2017 and 2019 Lapkus appeared in the HBO series Crashing in the reoccurring role of Jess, the main character's ex-wife.

In 2020, Lapkus launched a weekly podcast Newcomers with co-host Nicole Byer on the HeadGum podcast network, in which the two friends watch film franchises for the first time and provide commentary on each movie as newcomers to the series. On the podcast, Lapkus and Byer have covered the Star Wars, The Lord of the Rings, Tyler Perry, Fast & Furious, and Marvel Cinematic Universe franchises. Past guests have included John Gemberling, Demi Adejuyigbe, Paul F. Tompkins, and Betsy Sodaro. 

Lapkus performs improv regularly. She is a cast member of UCB's flagship show Asssscat and improv group Wild Horses.

Personal life
Lapkus married actor and improviser Chris Alvarado on May 3, 2014. She announced their separation on February 14, 2016, and they divorced later that year.

Lapkus married actor Mike Castle on October 5, 2018. On May 18, 2021, Lapkus announced that she and her husband were expecting a baby girl in the summer. She gave birth to a daughter named Holly in 2021.

Filmography

Film

Television

Video games

Podcasts

References

External links

 
Lauren Lapkus on Breaking it Down with Frank MacKay

1985 births
Living people
Actresses from Evanston, Illinois
American film actresses
American people of Greek descent
American people of Lithuanian descent
American people of Serbian descent
American podcasters
American television actresses
American women comedians
American women podcasters
Comedians from Illinois
DePaul University alumni
Evanston Township High School alumni
Upright Citizens Brigade Theater performers
21st-century American actresses
21st-century American comedians